Kim Sohyi is a South Korean chef and television personality.

Career
Kim is the owner and chef of Kim Kocht in Vienna, Austria, a fusion Korean restaurant that has been running since 2001. Kim was also a former judge of the cooking show MasterChef Korea.

References

External links

Living people
South Korean television chefs
South Korean food writers
Chefs of Korean cuisine
1965 births
South Korean chefs